In category theory, a branch of mathematics, the cocycle category of objects X, Y in a model category is a category in which the objects are pairs of maps  and the morphisms are obvious commutative diagrams between them. (It may also be defined using the language of 2-category.)

One has: if the model category is right proper and is such that weak equivalences are closed under finite products,

is bijective.

References 

 

Algebraic topology